Han Sang-ryul (born November 25, 1953) is the former Commissioner of the National Tax Service.

Experience

November 2007 ~ January 2009 - Commissioner of National Tax Service
July 2006 - Deputy Commissioner of National Tax Service
March 2006 - Chief of Seoul Regional Tax Office
April 2005 - Head of the Investigation Division of National Tax Service

Controversy
Despite being involved in a scandal surrounding Taegwang Industries, the Supreme Prosecutors' Office of the Republic of Korea did not pressure a formal investigation against Han Sang-Ryul.

He was the subject of criticism of a disgraced tax inspector, Kim Dong-il (김동일), who was indicted for posting a post that supported the former president, Roh Mu-hyun.

References

External links
  Naver People Profile

1953 births
People from South Chungcheong Province
Lee Myung-bak Government
Living people

ko:한상률